The 2016–17 USC Trojans women's basketball team will represent University of Southern California during the 2016–17 NCAA Division I women's basketball season. The Trojans, led by fourth year head coach Cynthia Cooper-Dyke, play their home games at the Galen Center and were members of the Pac-12 Conference. They finished the season 14–16, 5–13 in Pac-12 play to finish in a 4-way tie for ninth place. They lost in the first round Pac-12 women's basketball tournament to California.

On March 3, Cynthia Cooper-Duke resigns. She finished at USC with a 4-year record of 70–57.

Roster

Schedule

|-
!colspan=9 style="background:#990000; color:#FFCC00;"| Exhibition

|-
!colspan=9 style="background:#990000; color:#FFCC00;"| Non-conference regular season

|-
!colspan=9 style="background:#990000; color:#FFCC00;"| Pac-12 regular season

|-
!colspan=9 style="background:#990000;" color:#FFCC00"| Pac-12 Women's Tournament

Rankings

See also
 2016–17 USC Trojans men's basketball team

Notes
 March 3, 2017 – Cynthia Cooper-Dyke resigns after 4 years as head coach.

References

USC Trojans women's basketball seasons
USC
USC Trojans
USC Trojans